Mohammed Bello-Koko (born March 25, 1969) is a Nigerian former banker and current Managing Director of the Nigerian Ports a position he assumed on February 22, 2022.  Before his appointment as substantive managing director, Bello-Koko was on May 6, 2021, made the acting managing director of NPA when Hadiza Bala Usman was directed to handover to the most senior Executive Director after she was suspended for insubordination. Prior to the appointment as acting MD, Bello-Koko was the Executive Director, Finance & Administration of the Authority.

Early life and education 
Mohammed Bello-Koko was born on March 25, 1969 in Koko/Besse local government area in Kebbi State. He attended and completed his secondary school education at the Federal Government College Sokoto in 1986. He then proceeded to the Usmanu Danfodio University, Sokoto for his bachelor of science (B.Sc.) degree in Management Studies and Master’s degree in Business Administration (MBA) in 1992 and 1995 respectively.

Imbued by his penchant for continuous learning, he proceeded further to the Harvard Kennedy School, USA where he bagged an Executive Certificate in Public Leadership.

Career 
Bello Koko started his career with FSB International Bank Plc from the year 1996 to 2004 and functioned across several strategic portfolios including Banking operations, Credit-Risk Management, Treasury Operations, Retail banking and Corporate Marketing that found him in charge of Energy sector and Public Sector, thus responsible for managing accounts of several multinational oil and Gas companies, Public sector relationships.

He joined Zenith International Bank Plc in the year 2005 where he grew at various times to be Branch ahead, zonal Head Public Sector and also Large Corporates from where his exceptional contribution to the bank’s globally referenced profitability and balance sheet in the period 2005 to 2015 earned him numerous awards in the bank and a spot in the bank’s Executive Management Team as Deputy General Manager and Zonal Head.

Managing Director of Nigerian Ports Authority 
In the year 2016, Mohammed Bello Koko was appointed  by President Muhammadu Buhari as Executive Director Finance and Administration of the Nigerian Ports Authority (NPA), a role he held with distinction till May 2021, when he was appointed Acting Managing Director.

His sterling performance as acting Managing Director evidenced by plugging of income leakages, unprecedented growth in revenue and improved operational efficiencies that led to significant increase in container traffic to Onne Port and the demonstrated resolve to open up the Eastern Ports of Warri, Calabar and Rivers convinced President Muhammadu Buhari to confirm Koko as Managing Director of the NPA on the 15th of February, 2022.

As Managing Director of the Port Authority, Bello Koko revealed that measures and investments are being undertaken to create a fully digital ecosystem in port locations across Nigeria by 2025.

Personal life 
Mohammed Bello-Koko is married to Agatha Anne Koko, an entrepreneur.

Recognition 
As acting Director, Bello-Koko was a recipient of the 2021 Visionary Leadership Award  from Renner and Renner Consulting.

References

External links 
 Official Website - Nigerian Ports Authority
 Management Team - Mohammed Bello-Koko

Nigerian politicians
1969 births
People from Kebbi State
Living people
Usmanu Danfodiyo University alumni